Timothy McAllister (born October 21, 1972) is an American classical saxophonist and music educator, who, as of 2014, is Professor of Saxophone at the University of Michigan School of Music, Theatre & Dance.

Career 
Born in 1972, he gave his solo debut at age 16 with the Houston Civic Symphony.  As a teenager he attended the Interlochen Center for the Arts, where he studied with John Sampen. McAllister studied saxophone with Donald Sinta and conducting with H. Robert Reynolds at the University of Michigan. He holds a Bachelor of Music (1995), the Albert A. Stanley Medal (1995), Masters of Music (1997), and a Doctor of Musical Arts (2002). As of 2014, McAllister has been Professor of Saxophone at the University of Michigan School of Music, Theatre & Dance, a role held previously by Donald Sinta and Larry Teal. Each summer he teaches saxophone at Interlochen, the MPulse Saxophone Institute, Arosa Music Course in Switzerland, and the Orford Music Academy in Canada. From 2012 to 2014, McAllister was Co-Director of the Institute for New Music and saxophone professor at the Bienen School of Music at Northwestern.

He has premiered over 250 new works by composers including: Gunther Schuller, Caleb Burhans, Jennifer Higdon, Benjamin Broening, Kati Agocs, Mischa Zupko, Gregory Wanamaker, Roshanne Etezady, Kristin Kuster, William Bolcom, Martin Bresnick, Steven Mackey, Lee Hyla, Libby Larsen, Lei Liang, John Harbison, David Rakowski, Zhou Long, Chen Yi, Joel Puckett, Brian Fennelly, Evan Chambers, Ken Ueno, Donnacha Dennehy, David T. Little. His recording of William Bolcom’s Concert Suite for Alto Saxophone and Band was nominated for multiple Grammy Awards.

In 2013, he premiered Saxophone Concerto dedicated to him by the composer  John Adams with the Sydney Symphony Orchestra at the Sydney Opera House. The premiere was conducted by the composer. This concerto was a joint commission by St Louis, Baltimore and Sydney Symphony Orchestras and Fundacao Orquestra Sinfonica do estado de Sao Paulo. McAllister had previously given the World Premiere of Adams’ ‘City Noir’ in 2009. He is featured as the saxophone soloist on ‘City Noir’ (album) which won the 2014 Grammy Award for Best Orchestral Performance.

He is the soprano chair of the PRISM Saxophone Quartet.
He also regularly performs with the Chicago Symphony Orchestra, the Cabrillo Festival Orchestra, and the Los Angeles Philharmonic.

He appears on over 50 albums as a soloist, chamber musician, and orchestral saxophonist.

Selected Discography
"The Inaugural Concert: Gustavo Dudamel" DVD (LA Philharmonic) 2009
"John Mackey Soprano Sax Concerto" (ASU Wind Symphony) 2012
"Music of John Cage" (Simone Mancuso percussion) 2012
"The Singing Gobi Desert" (Prism Quartet) 2013
John Adams: City Noir; Saxophone Concerto (St. Louis Symphony Orchestra) 2014 (2015 GRAMMY winner)
"Music of Matthew Levy" (Prism Quartet) 2014
"Heritage/Evolution" (Prism Quartet) 2014
"Belle Nuit" (Kathryn Goodson, piano) 2015
"Music of Zae Munn" (Lucia Unrau, Piano and others) 2015
"The Fifth Century" (The Crossing and Prism Quartet) 2016 (2017 GRAMMY winner)
”Spiritualist: Kenneth Fuchs” (includes Saxophone Concerto “Rush”) (London Symphony Orchestra) 2018 (2019 GRAMMY winner)
”Lost Horizon: Guillaume Connesson” (includes ‘A Kind of Trane’ Concerto) (Brussels Philharmonic) 2019
”Animal, Vegetable, Mineral” (Prism Quartet) 2019
”Surfaces and Essences” (Prism Quartet) 2020
”Westland: Andy Scott” (Liz Ames, Piano) 2020
”Notturno” (Liz Ames, Piano) 2020

References

External links
  Official Site
  Prism Saxophone Quartet
  University of Michigan faculty biography
  Article from Northwestern University
  Interview transcript
  Interview on Saxophone Concerto

American male saxophonists
Classical saxophonists
Living people
University of Michigan School of Music, Theatre & Dance alumni
University of Michigan faculty
21st-century American saxophonists
21st-century American male musicians
1972 births